Salvatore Gioacchino Marrone (born 25 May 2001), is a Romanian professional footballer, who plays as a defender for Liga I side UTA Arad, on loan from Csíkszereda . Marrone grew up in Germany, in the football academies of VfB Stuttgart, SV Sandhausen and 1. FC Nürnberg, before moving to Romania, where he played for teams such as Academica Clinceni, Dunărea Călărași or FK Csíkszereda Miercurea Ciuc, at the level of Liga II.

References

External links
 
 

2001 births
Sportspeople from Pforzheim
Footballers from Baden-Württemberg
Footballers from Bucharest
Romanian people of Italian descent
German people of Italian descent
German people of Sicilian descent
German people of Romanian descent
Living people
Romanian footballers
Romania youth international footballers
Association football defenders
FC Steaua București players
Liga I players
Liga II players
LPS HD Clinceni players
FC Dunărea Călărași players
FK Csíkszereda Miercurea Ciuc players
FC Voluntari players
FC UTA Arad players